"Up Where We Belong" is a song written by Jack Nitzsche, Buffy Sainte-Marie and Will Jennings that was recorded by Joe Cocker and Jennifer Warnes for the 1982 film An Officer and a Gentleman. Warnes was recommended to sing a song from the film because of her previous soundtrack successes, and she had the idea for the song to be a duet that she would perform with Cocker. Jennings selected various sections of the score by Nitzsche and Sainte-Marie in creating the structure of the song and added lyrics about the struggles of life and love and the obstacles that people attempt to dodge. It was released in July of that year to coincide with the release of the film.

The song reached number one on the Billboard Hot 100 in the US and topped the charts in several other countries. It also sold more than one million copies in the US and was recognized by the Recording Industry Association of America as one of the Songs of the Century. Cocker and Warnes were awarded the Grammy for Best Pop Performance by a Duo or Group with Vocals, and Nitzsche, Sainte-Marie, and Jennings won both the Academy Award and Golden Globe Award for Best Original Song.

In 1984, the gospel duo BeBe & CeCe Winans recorded a religious variation of the song that received airplay on Christian radio stations, and their remake in 1996 earned them a GMA Dove Award. Various versions of the song have also been used to parody the final scene of the film on television shows such as Family Guy, The Simpsons, and South Park. The fact that the song is a ballad was seen as a misstep in Cocker's career, which had been built on performing rock and soul.

Background
On February 24, 1982, Joe Cocker performed "I'm So Glad I'm Standing Here Today" with the jazz group the Crusaders at the Grammy Awards. Their collaboration on the song for a Crusaders album had earned a nomination that year in the category of Best Inspirational Performance. Singer-songwriter Jennifer Warnes saw the show from home. She had been a fan of Cocker's since her teens and at one time had a poster of him on her wall showing him performing at Woodstock, and her love for the singer was still evident on this night many years later. "I was so moved, I was hollering out loud with joy, jumping up and down ... After a difficult battle with drugs and alcohol, Joe was in total command once again. I knew at that moment that I would sing with Joe." 
	
Meanwhile, plans were being made for An Officer and a Gentleman to be distributed by Paramount Pictures, and studio executive Frank Mancuso was insistent upon having some kind of music to use to promote the film. The director of the film, Taylor Hackford, was also interested in producing an original title song to help market it, but there was no remaining budget for such a recording. He proceeded with the idea anyway, working with Joel Sill, who was head of music at Paramount at the time, without anyone else at the studio knowing that they were doing so. The director consulted his friend Gary George to select a recording artist for the song. George, the former head of publicity at Warner Bros. Records, had recently become a manager and suggested Warnes, who was a client of his.

One of the six songs that Warnes had placed in the top half of the Billboard Hot 100 at that point was the number six hit "Right Time of the Night" from 1977. Her soundtrack credits included the Oscar-nominated "One More Hour" from Ragtime and the Oscar-winning "It Goes Like It Goes" from Norma Rae, which, like the Hackford film, also had a lead female character who worked in a factory. Hackford initially rejected the idea of Warnes singing a song for An Officer and a Gentleman "because he felt she had too sweet a sound," but Warnes met with Sill and discussed the possibility of doing so: "I suggested to Joel that I sing on that film in a duet with Joe Cocker." Sill thought this was an interesting idea but needed to convince Hackford of that. He said, "I discussed with Taylor, since the film centered really around Richard [Gere] and Debra [Winger] primarily, that maybe we should have a duet" and that with Cocker and Warnes they would be "matching the characters to some degree. The dynamic between the two was the soft and the rough, that, to some degree, Debra Winger's character was very, very soft in the picture, even though she was in a rough environment. And Richard Gere's character, to some degree, was really a rough character until he was softened up by her." Hackford thought the idea had potential and now had another friend in the music industry to ask for a favor. Chris Blackwell was the owner of Island Records, and Cocker was now recording for Island. "I called Chris and said I want to do this, and he just, on the phone, said, 'OK, I'll make this happen. What would initially convince Cocker to work on the project, however, was a small portion of the lyrics. He described it as "the 'Up' part, which is what made me realize it had hit potential. It was so unusual – that 'Love, lift us up ...

Composition and lyrics

The last scene of the film brought the story to a happy ending, and Hackford wanted to have a song playing during the closing credits that would act as a reflection of the relationship portrayed and incorporate the theme music composed by Jack Nitzsche and Buffy Saint-Marie. Nitzsche wanted to have Sainte-Marie write the lyrics, but her background in folk music caused Sill and Hackford to look elsewhere. Sill invited a lyricist whom he'd worked with before, Will Jennings, to the studio to view a rough cut of the film, and that gave Jennings inspiration for the structure and lyrics of what became "Up Where We Belong". "And all through the film I was hearing these bits and pieces of music, and at the end of it I had it in my head, you know, how there was a song. I heard a chorus here and a verse here and a bridge there, and so when I finished, Joel was there, and I said, 'Joel, just give me all the music from it,' all of Nitzsche's music, ' 'cause I got an idea. When Jennings presented Hackford with his demo, the director felt it was the perfect fit.

According to Musicnotes.com by Alfred Music Publishing, "Up Where We Belong" is written in common time. It is in the key of D major and sung in a vocal range from A3 to G5. The lyrics "tell of the struggles of life and love and the obstacles in the way that we attempt to dodge."

Recording and aftermath

Sill described Stewart Levine as the "record producer who we felt would give us the right interpretation of the song, add some soulfulness to it and also make it a hit record at the same time," but Levine was hesitant about traveling from his home in upstate New York to California for the job. He felt it would be worthwhile, however, because Jennings was involved. When Jennings played the demo over the phone for him, Levine responded that it was "great", and Warnes was certain "Up Where We Belong" would be a hit. Cocker, on the other hand, described the demo as "dreadful", despite his appreciation of some of the lyrics and the fact that Jennings was the lyricist on "I'm So Glad I'm Standing Here Today" and his more recent single, "Talking Back to the Night".

Cocker wanted to make the recording by himself, so Levine had Warnes record her vocals separately. Cocker had taken a break from touring to fly to Los Angeles for the session, but when it came time to record he, as Hackford described it, "was terrified. He didn't even want to go into the studio. Stewart Levine had to go and talk him out of the hotel to get him there." Cocker admitted, "I'd sat with the words in the afternoon but still hadn't remembered them, so we had to draw 'em up on big blocks of wood and stuff." A recording was made where the two voices were spliced together, but Warnes explained how persuasive their producer was in getting Cocker to agree to record the song alongside her: "Stewart Levine was gently insistent on the duet. Stewart understood that the contrast in our voices, the aural chemistry, would work. So Joe and I sang the song together. One or two takes, that was all." Cocker came around to seeing a hit song once it was complete, saying, "I knew it was a number one. Other people were saying, 'Well ... perhaps', but I could just feel it."

Hackford said that "the final version was absolute magic—or at least Joel and I thought so." They now had to present this song that they weren't budgeted to make to the executives at Paramount. "When we played it for Michael Eisner and Don Simpson, they hated the record and said it would never be a hit." Simpson even bet Sill $100 that it wouldn't be. Hackford and Sill "called another prominent record executive, who said, 'Forget it. Jennifer Warnes has never had a hit song and Joe Cocker's a has-been. Eisner and Simpson made Hackford "meet with various recording artist friends of theirs who tried to write songs, but their title songs didn't fit the movie." Hackford said, "Finally, one of the famous artists who was involved looked at the movie and said, to his credit, 'Hey, I can write something, but it's not going to work as well as the song you've got. Because they were running out of time before the film's release, Eisner and Simpson finally gave in, and "Up Where We Belong" made the final cut of the film and was released as a single on July 22, 1982.

Reception

Some radio stations refused to play "Up Where We Belong", even going so far as to send their copies back to Island Records. Cocker said, "I remember going into their offices in New York. I walked in and I said, 'How's the single doing?' And this guy Mike Abrahams, who worked there, he said, 'This is how well it's doing'—and the office was piled with returns." The single may have been recorded to promote the film, but Warnes pointed out that, in a sense, the success of the film was what sold the record.

"Up Where We Belong" debuted on the Billboard Hot 100 in the issue dated August 21 of that year and spent 3 weeks at number one during its 23 weeks there. That same issue also marked its first appearance on the magazine's list of the 50 most popular Adult Contemporary songs in the US, where it stayed for 25 weeks, 6 of which were at its peak position at number three. It also reached number seven on the UK Singles Chart in 1983 and received a Gold certification from the British Phonographic Industry (BPI) on January 6, 2023, for reaching sales and streams of 400,000 units. The Recording Industry Association of America (RIAA) awarded the song both Gold and Platinum certification for achieving sales of 500,000 and one million copies, respectively, on January 17, 1989.

Billboard reviewed the single at the time of its release in their July 31 issue. "This unlikely vocal pairing could prove less of a long shot than it sounds, given the recent gains made by other soundtrack associations. Add radio's ongoing affection for strong duets and a restrained performance by Cocker that matches him more sympathetically with Warnes's gentler style, and this track should find friends at A/C and mainstream pop stations." Matthew Greenwald of AllMusic wrote, "A gospel-inspired piece of pop song craftsmanship, the song moves with an underlying grace and subtle beauty. Faith, virtue, and, yes, the power of love is at the lyrical core here, and [the songwriters] convey this with a literate and timeless style. Truly a modern-day pop standard."

Awards and accolades

On January 29, 1983, Jennings, Nitzsche, and Sainte-Marie won the Golden Globe Award for Best Original Song. Cocker and Warnes won the Grammy Award for Best Pop Performance by a Duo or Group with Vocals on February 23 of that year. Two months later, on April 11, the songwriters won the Academy Award for Best Original Song. They also won the BAFTA film award for Best Original Song in 1984. On the Songs of the Century list compiled by the RIAA in 2001, the song was listed at number 323. In 2004, it finished at number 75 on AFI's 100 Years ... 100 Songs survey of top tunes in American cinema, and in 2016, one of the duo's live renditions of the song was listed at number 18 on Rolling Stone magazine's list of the 20 Greatest Best Song Oscar Performances. In 2020, it was included on Billboard magazine's list of the 25 Greatest Love Song Duets.

Live performances

Warnes and Cocker kept to an agreement that they would never lip-sync their performances of the song. One of their earliest live appearances was on the November 20, 1982, episode of Solid Gold. Saturday Night Live followed on February 5, 1983, and their performance at the 25th Annual Grammy Awards came later that month, on February 23. Backstage at the Grammys Warnes said about working with Cocker, "I was told it was the weirdest pairing ever," and regarding their April 11 appearance at the 55th Academy Awards, she admitted, "Neither of us were comfortable in the Oscar world. Joe performing in a white tuxedo, me in pink taffeta—how absurd."

In 2013, Cocker was honored in Berlin with a Goldene Kamera award, and Warnes joined him to sing the song at the ceremony. The day after Cocker's death in 2014, Warnes wrote, "I realized yesterday that we will never sing our song again. That thought makes me feel sick. We met last year in Berlin to sing together. I didn't know that would be our last time." Her visceral reaction to his death parallels the powerful chemistry they had in their many performances of the song, which she had summed up years earlier: "I always thought the pairing had a strong ring of truth to it. It was so unlikely, because Joe has this well-known, very raw, masculine energy. I was less well known and had this very vulnerable, quintessential female energy and we were very polarized, as men and women often are these days. But we met in the middle."

Legacy

The success of "Up Where We Belong" was not without its drawbacks for Cocker. He admitted that Island Records owner Chris Blackwell also hated the song and wasn't interested in releasing it. They had put out Cocker's first project for the label, Sheffield Steel, in June 1982, just a month before the song needed to be on store shelves if it was to coincide with the opening of the film. Cocker said, "The song was recorded within a matter of hours. Sheffield Steel – I spent a year on that. And the single eclipsed it overnight." But even ignoring its success, Blackwell was bothered by the fact that the duet wasn't R&B, which is what he was aiming for on Sheffield Steel.

Stewart Levine produced Cocker's next LP, which was intended for Island, but, the singer revealed, as with the duet, Blackwell hated it, so Cocker left Island for Capitol. The new label also had reservations about the number of slow ballads included on the new project. Another producer was brought in to give the album a different tone, and the result was the 1984 release Civilized Man. Peaking at number 133 on the Billboard 200, it was his lowest charting studio album in the US at that point.

Capitol had been responsible for rejuvenating the careers of Tina Turner and Heart in the mid-80s, so a push was on to do so for their new client with his next project, the 1986 album Cocker. Capitol's vice president of a&r, Don Grierson, explained, "After Civilized Man came out, Joe, Michael Lang [Cocker's manager], and I spent a lot of time zeroing in on just what the heck Joe Cocker was really all about. And it's my firm belief that Joe is a rocker." His feeling was that "Up Where We Belong" turned out to be a double-edged sword. "It helped Joe in one sense, but it was very, very detrimental to him in another. It gave him a hit record and brought his name back to the mass market again. However, because it was such a pop, middle-of-the-road record, it took away Joe's roots in the eyes of the public and certainly in the industry."

Credits and personnel
Credits adapted from album liner notes for The Best of Joe Cocker.

Joe Cocker – lead vocals
Jennifer Warnes – lead vocals
Stewart Levine – producer
Abraham Laboriel – bass
Leon "Ndugu" Chancler – drums
Louis Shelton – guitar
Bobby Lyle – keyboards
Robbie Buchanan – keyboards
Paulinho da Costa – percussion

Charts

Weekly charts

Year-end charts

Certifications and sales

Notable cover versions and parodies

Televangelist Tammy Faye Bakker suggested that BeBe & CeCe Winans, two of the singers from The PTL Club, record "Up Where We Belong" after she heard the original duet in a record store, and Larnelle Harris helped BeBe make the lyrics more appealing to a Christian audience. Their 1984 cover of the song from their album Lord Lift Us Up reached number 27 on the Christian Radio Hits chart issued by SoundScan. The duo rerecorded their gospel version in 1996 for their Greatest Hits album, and their new version won the 1998 GMA Dove Award for Contemporary Gospel Song of the Year.

The part of the score of An Officer and a Gentleman that Jennings used in writing the chorus for "Up Where We Belong" can be heard in the final scene of the film in which Gere picks Winger up in his arms and carries her out of the factory past clapping co-workers. The last shot of the film freezes on their exit as the score comes to a big orchestral finish, and the credits start to roll as Cocker and Warnes begin singing the song at the chorus. Although the song itself is heard separately from the final scene, it has often taken the place of the score in send-ups of the grand finale over the years. Films and television shows that have used some variation of "Up Where We Belong" in doing so include Bridget Jones's Baby, The Cleveland Show,
Everybody Hates Chris, Family Guy, Friends, The Goldbergs, The Office, Sabrina the Teenage Witch, Scrubs, The Simpsons, and South Park.

See also
List of number-one singles of 1982 (Canada)
List of Billboard Hot 100 number-one singles of 1982
List of number-one singles in Australia during the 1980s

References

Bibliography

 

1982 singles
1982 songs
American soft rock songs
British soft rock songs
Jennifer Warnes songs
Joe Cocker songs
Buffy Sainte-Marie songs
Glen Campbell songs
Yvonne Elliman songs
Island Records singles
Best Original Song Golden Globe winning songs
Best Original Song Academy Award-winning songs
Billboard Hot 100 number-one singles
Cashbox number-one singles
RPM Top Singles number-one singles
Number-one singles in South Africa
Number-one singles in Australia
Songs written by Jack Nitzsche
Songs with lyrics by Will Jennings
Pop ballads
1980s ballads
Love themes
Male–female vocal duets
Rock ballads